Melissa Iris McIntosh (born 24 August 1977) is an Australian politician. She is a member of the Liberal Party and was elected to the House of Representatives at the 2019 federal election, running in the New South Wales seat of Lindsay.

Early life
McIntosh was born on 24 August 1977 in Penrith, New South Wales. Her father Edmund Grah immigrated to Australia in the late 1950s from Graz, Austria. His parents and sister had been killed in World War II.

McIntosh studied journalism, public relations and video production at the University of Western Sydney, graduating with the degree of Bachelor of Communications.

Career
McIntosh began working in politics after graduating university, working as an aide to arts and sport minister Jackie Kelly and later in the office of Prime Minister John Howard. From 2011 to 2015, she worked at the United States Studies Centre at the University of Sydney as head of partnerships and director of events. She then served as chief of staff to Assistant Treasurer Alex Hawke until 2016, when she joined Wentworth Community Housing as executive manager (communications).

Prior to her election to parliament, McIntosh was a vice-president of the Liberal Party of Australia (New South Wales Division) and a member of the state executive. She was an unsuccessful candidate for the Fourth Ward of the Blue Mountains City Council in 2016.

McIntosh is a member of the centre-right faction of the Liberal Party.

Member of Parliament
In November 2018, McIntosh won Liberal preselection for the Division of Lindsay. She was elected to the House of Representatives at the 2019 federal election, defeating Australian Labor Party (ALP) candidate Diane Beamer, who had defeated the incumbent ALP member Emma Husar for preselection.

Personal life
McIntosh has three children with her husband Stuart McIntosh, a former Olympic canoeist. They met at the 2000 Summer Olympics in Sydney. She has sometimes used the name "Melissa Grah-McIntosh".

References

1977 births
Living people
Liberal Party of Australia members of the Parliament of Australia
Members of the Australian House of Representatives
Members of the Australian House of Representatives for Lindsay
Australian people of Austrian descent
Women members of the Australian House of Representatives
21st-century Australian politicians
21st-century Australian women politicians
Australian public relations people
Western Sydney University alumni